Keith Barron (8 August 1934 – 15 November 2017) was an English actor and television presenter who appeared in films and on television from 1961 until 2017. His television roles included the police drama The Odd Man, the sitcom Duty Free, and Gregory Wilmot in Upstairs, Downstairs.

Career
Born in Mexborough in the West Riding of Yorkshire, Barron completed his national service in the Royal Air Force and his acting career started at the Sheffield Repertory Theatre, where he also met his wife, Mary, a stage designer. He became well known to British television viewers in the early 1960s as the easygoing Detective Sergeant Swift in the Granada TV series The Odd Man and its spin-off It's Dark Outside. His major breakthrough, however, was as Nigel Barton in the writer Dennis Potter's semi-autobiographical plays Stand Up, Nigel Barton and Vote, Vote, Vote for Nigel Barton (both 1965) in BBC1's The Wednesday Play anthology series; he later played a very similar character in Potter's Play For Today episode Only Make Believe (1973).

Barron made many one-off television appearances, from Redcap and Z-Cars in the mid-1960s, to Randall and Hopkirk (Deceased), Strange Report, The New Avengers, Thriller, The Professionals, Foyle's War, and A Touch of Frost. He made two appearances in Upstairs, Downstairs as Australian Gregory Wilmot. In 1982, he appeared in the Dutch show De lachende scheerkwast. In March 1983 he was a guest in the Doctor Who story Enlightenment, replacing Peter Sallis who was unavailable. He was a frequent voiceover artist for British TV commercials and public information films.
Barron also played a starring role as Bob Ferguson in the 1993 Granada series The Case-Book of Sherlock Holmes, entitled The Last Vampyre.

In 1989 he starred on television in a story of relationships in a new town in the Midlands entitled Take Me Home, with Annette Crosbie as his wife and Maggie O'Neill as his girlfriend. One of his best-loved and best-remembered roles was in the 1980s Yorkshire Television sitcom Duty Free. In the 1990s he co-starred in the sitcoms Haggard and All Night Long. In 1990, he appeared as a contestant on Cluedo, facing off against fellow actor Andrew Sachs. In the 2000s he was a regular character on the ITV Sunday-night drama Where the Heart Is. In 2014 he reprised his role of David Pearce in the touring stage show of the TV series 'Duty Free'. He also starred in the first series of the BBC drama The Chase.

On the big screen he appeared in Baby Love (1968) and David Puttnam's film Melody (1971) as Mr Latimer.

Barron also appeared as the guest celebrity in dictionary corner on several episodes of the Channel 4 words and numbers game Countdown.

He was the star on Bunn and Co., a radio show that was broadcast from March 2003 to April 2004 on BBC Radio 4. Barron's performance in the BBC's Test the Nation IQ test show on 2 September 2006 gave him an IQ of 146. In 2007 Barron joined ITV1's Coronation Street as George Trench. In 2011, Barron starred in the BBC show, Lapland, a role which he returned to for a series, Being Eileen, from February 2013.

Personal life
Barron died on 15 November 2017 after a short illness. He was survived by his wife of 58 years, Mary Pickard, and his actor son, Jamie. He lived in the Surrey town of East Molesey for some years.

Selected filmography
 Baby Love (1969) – Doctor Robert Quayle
 The Man Who Had Power Over Women (1970) – Jake Braid
 The Firechasers (1971) – Jim Maxwell
 She'll Follow You Anywhere (1971) – Alan Simpson
 Melody (1971) – Mr. Latimer – Daniel's father (uncredited)
 Freelance (1971) – Gary
 Nothing But The Night (1973) – Dr. Haynes
 The Land That Time Forgot (1974) – Bradley
 At the Earth's Core (1976) – Dowsett
 Voyage of the Damned (1976) – Purser Mueller
 God's Outlaw (1986) – Henry VIII
 La passione (1996) – Roy
 Police 2020 (1997) – Eddie Longshaw
 Lapland (2011, TV Movie) – Maurice
 In Love with Alma Cogan (2012) – Cedric

Television

 A Chance of Thunder (TV Series) (1961) – Bank Cashier
 The Night of the Match (TV Movie) (1961) – Bob
 The Avengers (TV Series) (1961) – Technician
 The Odd Man (1962–1963) – Det. Sgt. Swift
 It's Dark Outside (1964) – Det. Sgt. John Swift
 Crane (1965) – Rene Leclerc
 The Troubleshooters (1965) – Miles
 Stand Up, Nigel Barton The Wednesday Play (1965) – Nigel Barton
 Vote, Vote, Vote for Nigel Barton The Wednesday Play (1965) – Nigel Barton
 Spywatch (1967)
 Further Adventures of Lucky Jim (1967) – Jim Dixon 
 A Family at War (1972) Major Harkness 
 Thinking Man as Hero (1973, TV Movie) – David Duncan
 Armchair_Theatre (1973, Red Riding Hood TV Movie) – Henry
 Upstairs, Downstairs (1974) – Gregory Wilmot
 No Strings (1974) – Derek
 The Foundation (1977) – Don Prince
 The Professionals (1977) "Private Madness, Public Danger" – Charles Nesbitt
 Telford's Change (1979) – Tim Hart
 Prince Regent (1979) – Charles James Fox
 Stay with Me Till Morning (1981) – Stephen Belgard
 Tales of the Unexpected (1982) "A Harmless Vanity" – George Hitchman
 De lachende scheerkwast (1982) - Mr Carrington
 Doctor Who (1983) "Enlightenment" – Striker
 Minder (1984) – Johnny Caine
 Leaving (1984–1985) – Daniel Ford
 Duty Free (1984–1986) – David Pearce / David
 Room at the Bottom (1986–1988) – Kevin Hughes
 Take Me Home (1989) – Tom
 Haggard (TV series) (1990–92) – Squire Amos Haggard
 The Good Guys (1992) – Guy Lofthouse
 Sherlock Holmes The Last Vampyre (1994) – Rob Ferguson
 Under the Hammer (1994) –  Ned Nunelly
 Ruth Rendell Mysteries A Case of Coincidence (1996) – Inspector Masters
 Dalziel and Pascoe episode 6, 28 July 1997, – Dick Elgood.
 Pie in the Sky episode 34, series 5–6, July 1997 – Chairman of a Jury housed overnight in the Luxor Hotel
 Spywatch (1996) – Norman Starkey (adult)
 The Round Tower (Catherine Cookson), UK TV series (1998) – Jonathan Ratcliffe
 Peak Practice (2000) - Series 9 Episode 12 "Last Orders" - Jeff Barton
 NCS: Manhunt (2001–2002) – Detective Superintendent Bob Beausoleil
 Clocking Off (2003) – Roy Fletcher
 Where the Heart Is (2003) – Alan Boothe
 Midsomer Murders: "The Straw Woman" (2004) – Alan Clifford
 New Tricks (2005) – Ronnie Ross
 The Chase (2006–2007) – George Williams
 Pickles: The Dog Who Won the World Cup (2006, TV Movie) – Bernie
 Foyle's War:S4E1 "Invasion" (2007) – David Barrett
 Heartbeat series 18, episode 6 'Strike up the band' (2008) – Les Hepplewhite 
 Benidorm (2009) – Deputy Mayor
 My Family Ben Behaving Badly (2010) - Harry
 Doctors (2011–2015) – Arthur Barrett / Ludo Jameson / Brian Olsen
 Being Eileen (2013) – Maurice
 Stella (2014) – The Captain
 DCI Banks (2015–2016) – Arthur Banks 
 Not Going Out (2017) – Michael (final television appearance) The BBC dedicated the episode in Barron's memory. 

Radio
 Not as Far as Velma, as Commissaire Henri Castang (1990)
 To the Manor Born, as Richard Devere (1997)
 My Turn to Make the Tea'' as Mr Pellet (2006)

Notes

References

External links
 
 Keith Barron at Aveleyman

1934 births
2017 deaths
20th-century Royal Air Force personnel
English male film actors
English male television actors
English male voice actors
People from Mexborough
People from Molesey
Actors from Yorkshire
Male actors from Surrey
Actors from Doncaster